Damophon (fl. 2nd century BC) was an ancient Greek sculptor of the Hellenistic period from Messene, who executed many statues for the people of Messene, Megalopolis, Aegium, Lycosura and other cities of Peloponnesus. He was also known beyond Peloponnese; his works were in other places like the Leucas, Cephallenia, Kynthos, Melos,  and Oiantheia.

His statues were acroliths. Considerable fragments, including three colossal heads from a group by him representing Demeter, Persephone, Artemis and the Titan Anytos, were discovered on the site of Lycosura in Arcadia, where there was a sanctuary of the goddess Despoina, The Mistress. They were preserved in part in the National Archaeological Museum of Athens and partly at a small museum on the archaeological site. Damophon also restored Phidias' statue of the Greek god Zeus, which had been damaged in an earthquake.  There has been some debate about his dates but recent work at Messene where other works of his have been found indicated a date around 190 BC for his floruit seems likely rather than the later one that used to be proposed.

More information about the life of Damophon, and about his work for various other Greek cities, has been provided by an inscription found at Messene, which was uncovered by archaeologists in two parts, in 1972 and 1989.

References

Hellenistic sculptors